Kerch Polytechnic College is a higher education institution in Kerch, Crimea. It trains personnel in 16 specialties, and about 300 students enroll for first-year studies at the college annually.

History 
Having trained about a thousand graduates by the time of the German invasion in 1941, the tekhnikum was eventually evacuated to the Urals to later return to Kerch in 1945. Thereafter, it produced various specialists to work in metallurgical regions of Ukraine and at the Soviet Ministry of Ferrous Metallurgy, remaining the sole special secondary educational institution in the city until 1952.

The tekhnikum changed its profile and became a polytechnic in 1990. In 2011, it has been reorganized into Kerch Polytechnic College of the National University of Food Technologies.

Shortly after the annexation of Crimea by Russia, the college was nationalized under Order of the State Council of Crimea on 11 April 2014. On 7 April 2015, the Museum of Battle Glory was opened at the college on the initiative of its tutor Vitaly Nekrasov. The Kerch Tekhnikum of Service Industry (found in 1925) was merged with Kerch Polytechnic College in 2016.

On 17 October 2018, it was the site of the Kerch Polytechnic College massacre, in which 20 people were killed and 70 injured. The perpetrator subsequently committed suicide at the scene.

Notable alumni
  (1921–1943) – Hero of the Soviet Union, junior lieutenant.
  (1920–1945) – Hero of the Soviet Union, sergeant.

References

External links 
 
 

1930 establishments in Russia
Buildings and structures in Kerch
Educational institutions established in 1930
Public universities and colleges in Russia
Technical universities and colleges in Russia
Technical universities and colleges in Ukraine
Universities and colleges in Crimea